Retinia comstockiana, the pitch twig moth or Comstock's retinia moth, is a species of moth of the family Tortricidae. It is found in the United States, including Massachusetts, New York and Pennsylvania.

The larvae feed on Pinus rigida. They bore into the twigs of their host plant.

References

Moths described in 1879
Eucosmini